Nåvatnet is a lake in the municipality of Åseral in Agder county, Norway. The lake has four dams at various locations at the southern end for purposes of power generation at the nearby Skjerka power station.

See also
List of lakes in Norway

References

Åseral
Lakes of Agder